Brian McAllister (born 30 November 1970) is a Scottish former professional footballer who played as a defender.

He notably played in the Premier League for Wimbledon, having also played in the Football League for Plymouth Argyle and Crewe Alexandra and in New Zealand with Napier City Rovers. He was capped three times by Scotland national team.

Club career
Early in his career, McAllister helped Napier City Rovers win the New Zealand National Soccer League title in 1989.

McAllister played for Wimbledon between 1989 and 2000 and had loan spells at Plymouth Argyle and Crewe Alexandra. He was forced to retire in 2000 due to a heel injury. His most regular action for Wimbledon came during the final four seasons he spent at the club.

International career
He earned three Scotland caps in 1997, playing against Belarus, Malta and Wales.

References

External links

International stats at Londonhearts.com

1970 births
Crewe Alexandra F.C. players
Living people
Plymouth Argyle F.C. players
Premier League players
Scotland international footballers
Scottish footballers
English Football League players
Wimbledon F.C. players
Napier City Rovers FC players
Association football defenders